Karnataka, the sixth largest state in India, has been ranked as the third most popular state in the country for tourism in 2014.
 It is home to 507 of the 3600 centrally protected monuments in India, the largest number after Uttar Pradesh. The State Directorate of Archaeology and Museums protects an additional 752 monuments and another 25,000 monuments are yet to receive protection. Tourism centres on the ancient sculptured temples, modern cities, the hill ranges, forests and beaches etc. Broadly, tourism in Karnataka can be divided into four geographical regions: North Karnataka, the Hill Stations, Coastal Karnataka and South Karnataka.

The Karnataka government has recently introduced The Golden Chariot – a train which connects popular tourist destinations in the state and Goa.

The Karnataka State Tourism Development Corporation promotes tourism in Karnataka.

North Karnataka

North Karnataka has monuments that date back to the 5th century. Kannada empires that ruled the Deccan had their capitals here. Badami Chalukyas monuments are located at Pattadakal, Aihole and Badami. Aihole has been called the cradle of Indian architecture and has over 125 temples and monuments built between 450 and 1100 CE. Rashtrakuta monuments at Lokapura, Bilgi and Kuknur and Kalyani Chalukyas monuments built in Gadag style of architecture at Lakkundi, Gadag, Itagi (in Koppal District) and the Vijayanagar empire temples at Vijayanagara are some examples. Hampi in Bellary district has ruins spread over an area of 125 km2. With some fifty four world heritage monuments and six hundred and fifty national monuments (ASI). An additional three hundred monuments await protection. The Deccan sultanate monuments at Bijapur and Gulbarga show unique and discreet Hindu influences, and rival the Muslim monuments of North India. Archeologically important locations like Sannati, Kanaganahalli in Kalaburagi district have thrown more light on Buddhist centres of the 1st century BCE to 3rd century CE. The first ever statue of emperor Ashoka with his queens and a Prakrit inscription Rayo Ashoka (ASI) has been found.

Badami surroundings important locations are Kudalasangama, Aihole, Pattadakal, Mahakuta and Banashankari.

Hampi surroundings region, they can be visited from Hampi/Hosapete, or from Hubli. There are Kuknur, Itagi, Gadag, Lakkundi, Dambal, Haveri, Kaginele, Bankapura.

Haveri district shiggaon taluk gotagodi place has an 8 World Records holder museum known as Utsav Rock Garden , is one of the finest Museums in India a cultural heritage and educational tourist center has over 2000 international quality sculptures depicting rural life and traditional farming, folk games, folk life of a village etc. . Visit its Website here,

World heritage centres

 Hampi, Bellary district: The site of the capital of Vijayanagara (1336) and formerly the seat of the Vijayanagar Empire. Foreign visitors in the 15th and 16th centuries described Hampi as being bigger than Rome. The city was destroyed and deserted in 1565 by marauding Moghul invaders and its ruins now lie scattered over a 26 sq. km area south of the river Tungabhadra. The rocky area near Anegundi to the north of the river has been identified as Kishkindha of Ramayana times. Hampi is home to a  monolithic Narasimha, which was installed by Krishnadevaraya in 1529. The remains of palaces and gateways can be seen.
 Group of 8th-century CE monuments, Pattadakal: Located on the banks of the river Malaprabha, Pattadakal was the second capital of the Chalukyas and contains examples of 7th- and 8th-century temple architecture. Four temples are in the south Indian Dravidian style, four in the North Indian Nagara style and the last one, the Papanatha temple represents a hybrid of the two styles. The oldest temples are the Sangameshwara, Mallikarjuna and Virupaksha Temples.

Historical locations

Chalukya

 Aihole: a former Chalukya trading city. There are around 140 temples including examples of early Chalukya, Rashtrakuta and later Chalukya dynasties from the 6th to 12th centuries. It has a Jain and Vedic rock-cut shrine, both of about the 6th century. It has Tirthankara images and a Durga temple. The meguti on a hill is a jaina basti which has an Aihole inscription of Pulakeshin 2 and also a Buddhist two-storied rock -cut shrine below it. All the other Jain and Buddhist temples are built of stone and resemble Hindu temples. The temples were built during the Middle Ages before any style was established and hence there is a mixture of styles.

 Badami: the capital of the early Chalukyas in the 6th century, is at the mouth of a ravine between two rocky hills. The town is known for its cave temples (all carved out of sandstone hills). Badami have four caves, the cave temple dedicated to Vishnu is the largest. In front of the cave temple, there is a reservoir called Aghastya Teertha dotted with temples on its bank. Among them, two are dedicated to Vishnu, one to Shiva and the fourth is a Jain Temple. Carvings in the cave temples display the Hindu gods, Narashima and Hari Hara. The temples also have paintings on the ceiling and bracket figures on the piers.

 Basavana Bagewadi: It is 43 east of Bijapur. In the 12th century, Saint Basaveshwara was born here. It was an agrahara. The main temple here is in the Chalukya style and it was called as Sangamantha in records. The Samadhis of Siddharameshwara and Gurupadeshwara of the Inchageri school of spiritual pursuit are seen here.
 Basavakalyana, Bidar District: former capital of the Later Chalukyas. It has an old fort renovated by the Bahamani containing an Archaeological Museum. Few Chalukya or Kalachuri remains exist except the Chalukya Narayanapur temple in the outskirts of the town. There is a modern Basaveshwara temple, Prabhudevara Gadduge, Jurist of the Kalyani Chalukyas period. Vijnaneshwara's Cave, Madivala Machiah's Pond, Akka Nagamma's Cave, fully renovated Siddheshwara temple and a new structure called Anubhava Mantapa, the Qaji's mosque and Raja Bagh Sawar Dargah.

 Annigeri (30 km from Hubli): It has an Amriteshwara temple of the time of the Kalyani Chalukyas. It was the birthplace of great Kannada Poet Pampa and there is a Jain basadi of Parshwanatha. It was once a headquarters of Belvola-300. It was the capital of Chalukya Someshwara 4. In addition to Veerashaiva Mathas; there is a ruined Banashankari Temple and seven mosques and also an ancient Veerabhadra temple.
 Bankapura (80 km from Dharwad): Under Chalukya many temples were raised in the city including the Nagareshwara temple in the fort and another chalukya temple called Siddheshwara. Ali Adilshahi destroyed many temples in about 1567. There is a mosque in the fort.
 Dambal (21 km from Gadag): It was a Buddhist centre. There are two notable chalukya temples called Doddabasappa Temple and Somewshwara Temple. Doddabassapa as polygonal star shaped temple garbhagriha and fine sculptural representations and huge nandi Temple. Someshwara could have been an old basati. The temple has a 400-year-old vast tank. There is an old Ganapathi image in old ruined fort. And we can also find a huge Ganapathi image in a small shrine.
 Haveri: This town has Siddheshvara Temple that was built in the 12th century. Siddeshvara Temple situated in the heart of the city of Haveri, inside the well-maintained garden.
 Gadag: It is a twin city municipality and it is 55 km from Hubli-Dharward. It is a great centre of Kalyani Chalukyas art with the large Trikuteshwara temple. It has Sri Lakshmi Venkateshwara temple is situated at Venkatapura Taluk near Sortur, Gadag District. Temple was renovated by Brahmananda Swami, a devotee of Gondavalekar Maharaj a sage from Gondavale. It was later expanded by Kalyani Chalukyas into a vast complex. The complex has triple shrines once housing Shiva, Brahma and Surya. The Saraswathi temple has the shining decorative pillars, and the Saraswathi image, and it is one of the largest examples of Chalukya art. The place has Someshwara and Rameshwara temples of Chalukya style. It has Veeranarayana temple of Chalukya times.

 Lakkundi, 10 km from Gadag, Gadag District: There were 100 temples and 100 wells but now few can be visited. These include Brahma Jinalaya, Kasivisvesvara and Kalyani.
 Someshwara temple complex Lakshmeshwar in the Shirahatti Taluk, Gadag District, North Karnataka. The temple complex has the Someshwara temple of Shiva along with so many Shiva temples inside the fort-like compound.
 Galaganatha Galageshwara temple is located in the Haveri District. The temple has big open hall and pyramidal shaped Garbhagudi. The temple is situated along the Tungabhadra river.
 Chaudayyadanapura Mukteshwara temple, near Ranebennur in Haveri District, North Karnataka
 Mahadeva Temple (Itagi) in the Koppal district, North Karnataka, built during 1112 CE. This temple is an example of dravida articulation with a nagara superstructure. This Temple is also called Devalayagala Chakravarti in Kannada (Emperor among Temples).
 Panchakuta Basadi, Kambadahalli in Mandya district was built in the 8th century. This temple is one of the finest examples of South Indian Dravidian architecture of the Western Ganga.
 Shambulinga Temple, Kundgol is about 15 km from Hubli-Dharwad. This place is famous for Hindustani music and Huge Shambulinga Temple.

 Hooli Panchalingeshwara Temple
 Lakshmeshwar has Someshwara temple complex, Jain Basadis.
 Kudalasangama has Sangamanatha temple which belongs to Chalukya. It is a Karma Bhumi of Basavanna. Kudalasangama development authority has developed this place as one of the International tourism place. From Kudalasangama Almatti Dam is about 12 km, it has got North Karnataka's biggest Rock Garden.

Rashtrakuta dynasty
 Malkhed, Kalaburagi district
 Naregal, Gadag District
 Belgaum Fort

Kadamba dynasty

 Halasi
The place is in Background of Western Ghats in lush, green atmosphere. It was the second capital of the Kadambas of Banavasi. The huge Bhuvaraha Narasimha temple has tall images of Varaha, Narasimha, Narayana and Surya. Halasi has a fort and temples of Gokarneshswara, Kapileshwara, Swarneshwara and Hatakeshwara.
 Hangal
Hanagal was the capital of Hangal Kadambas, feudatories of Kalyani Chalukyas. It was mentioned as Panungal in records and identified by tradition with Viratanagara of Mahabharatha days. It is on the left bank of the Dharma River. The Tarakeshwara temple here is a huge structure with series of images and polished tall Chalukya pillars. The other temples are Virabhadra, Billeshwara and Ramalinga etc. There is a Veerashaiva Kumaraswamy Matha here.
 Banavasi
Banavasi was the capital of Kadambas. The place is on the bank of the Varada river and its laterite fort is surrounded by the river at its three sides. Ashoka is said to have sent his missionaries to 'Vanavasa'. Banavasi also contains Buddhist brick monuments. Chutu prince Nagashri built a Buddhist Vihara, a tank and installed a Naga image at the place according to a Prakrit record at the place. There is also a monument at Banavasi, Mudhukeshvara temple and also Kadamba Nagara Shikhara is seen on the garbhagriha of this temple. Records here indicate that Buddhism and Jainism were popular.

Deccan Sultanates

 Bijapur: The former capital of the Adil Shahi Kings (1489–1686). Gol Gumbaz is the mausoleum of Muhammed Adil Shah and was built in 1659. It houses the world's second largest dome, unsupported by pillars. Malik-e-Maidan is a 55-ton cannon perched on a platform. The head of the cannon is fashioned into the shape of a lion whose jaws are trying to devour an elephant.
 Bidar: a centre for Bidriware. It is the location of the tombs of 30 rulers including the Chaukhandi of Hazrat Khalil-Ullah Shah and Sultan Ahmed Shah Al Wali Bahamani from the Bahamani dynasty.
 Gulbarga
 Raichur
 Lakshmeshwar: The Jumma Masjid, built during the rule of Adilshahi, has a large crowning onion dome and Koranic scripture written in gold.

Rattas
 Saundatti: The town proper has a fort on the hill built during the 17th century, by Sirasangi Desai, with eight bastions. It was the capital of Rattas who later shifted their headquarters to Belgaum. There are two temples of Ankeshwara, Puradeshwara, Mallikarjuna, Venkateshwara and the Veerabhadra. The Renukasagar waters touch the outskirts of Saundatti. Tourist attractions of this region are Hooli Panchalingeshwara temple, Renuka (Yallamma) temple, Saundatti Fort, Parasgad Fort, Navilateertha.

Jain Basadis

Jainism has a long history in Karnataka. Belgaum District has the Kamala basadi in Chalukya style in the Belgaum Fort. The
ancient centre Tavanidi near Nippani and newly created centre at Shedbal, where 24 Tirthankaras in white marble have been installed in a cluster.

The Chalukyas of Badami built cave temples at Badami, Pattadkal and Aihole. Puligere was a strong centre of religious activities of the Jain monks during this era.

Lakkundi in Gadag District has a large Brahma Jinalaya of Chalukya style, built by a noble lady, Attimabbe.

Navagraha Jain Temple at Varur near Hubli is one of the major pilgrimage. The temple features a 61 feet (18.6 m) tall monolithic idol of the Shri 1008 Bhagavan Parshvanatha and the smaller statues of the other 8 Jain teerthankaras.

Buddhist temples
 Tara Bhagavati temples, Balligavi, Shiralkoppa
 Koliwada and Dambal, Gadag district
 Sannati and Kanaganahalli, Kalaburagi district: remains of the razed stupas and a Buddhist plaques of Satavahana period were unearthed recently
 Aihole: Viharas
 Badami: Buddhist remains from the Badami Chalukyas period were found between caves two and three
 Mundgod, Uttara Kannada: Tibetan settlements with multi-coloured stupas and painted prayer halls
 Gulbarga: Two new viharas

Shiva temples

Gokarna is a great all-India centre where the Atmalinga (Mahabaleshwara) of Shiva, brought by Ravana is believed to have been installed. Nearby is Murdeshwar where a huge modern Shiva temple in Dravidian Style has been raised, renovating an ancient shrine. Both the places are on the sea-shore in Uttara Kannada. At Hampi is the Virupaksha Temple, venerated by generations of poets, scholars, kings and commoners.

The Shiva temple at Kudalasangama in Bagalkot District is associated with Saint Basaveshwara. Equally remarkable pieces of art are the Virupaksha and the Mallikarjuna at Pattadakal in Bagalkote dt.

The Veerashaivas have many venerated places, either associated with Basaveshwara or his contemporaries. Basavana Bagewadi was his place of birth and Kudala Sangama the place of his spiritual practices, are in Bijapur and Bagalkot dts. The latter is at the confluence of the river Krishna and the Malaprabha. Basava Kalyana (Kalyani), the ancient Chalukya capital in Bidar District was the place where he conducted his socio-religious movement. Ulavi in Uttara Kannada, a quiet place amidst forests, has the samadhi of Chennabasavanna, Basaveshwara's nephew. Belgami (Balligavi), the Chalukya art centre in Shimoga dt. is identified as the birthplace of Allama Prabhu and Uduthadi near it, is the native place of Akka Mahadevi.
Later Veerashaiva saints are associated with many places. Kodekal (Gulbarga dt.) Basavanna temple, Kadakola Madivallajja Matha, Sharana Basaveshwara temple and Dasoha Math at Gulbarga are few more places of worship.

Athani has the samadhi of the Veerashaiva Saint Shivayogi. Some of the outstanding Veerashaiva Mathas are seen at Naganur near Bailhongal and Kalmatha in Belgaum, Durudundeshwara Matha at Arabhavi and Mahantaswamy Matha
at Murgod are in Belgaum dt. Murugha Matha (Dharwad), Annadaneshwara Matha (Mundargi), Tontadarya Matha at Gadag and Dambal, Moorusavira Matha at Hubli, Murugha Matha and Hukkeri Matha (Haveri), Taralabalu Matha at Sirigere, Murugharajendra Matha at Chitradurga, Banthanala Shivajogi Matha at Chadachan and Mahantaswamy Matha (Ilkal) are equally notable. The samadhi of Sharanabasappa Appa at Gulbarga.

Shakti Sthala
The following places are visited by devotees of Shakti
 Chandralamba, Sannati, Gulbarga
 Bagyawanti, Ghattaragi
 Mayavva, Chinchli
 Yellamma, Saundatti
 Banashankari, Badami, Bagalkote district
 Bhuvaneshwari, Hampi
 Varadahalli, Sagara, Karnataka
 Sigandur, Sagara, Karnataka
 Marikamba, Sagara, Karnataka
 Marikamba, Sirsi, Uttara Kannada
 Durga Parameshwari Kateel, Dakshina Kannada
 Mookambika Kollur, Udupi District
 Mysore Karnataka, Mysore District

Temple tanks

 Agastya Teertha, Badami
 Mahakuta group of temples, near Badami
 Banashankari, near Badami
 Lakkundi, near Gadag
 Hampi

Coastal Karnataka

Coastal Karnataka is the stronghold of Hindu and Jain pilgrimage spots with Udupi and its many temples being the centre of Dvaita philosophy, Gokarna is known for Vedic studies, Sringeri has the first of the Shankaracharya mathas and is important for its Advaita philosophy, Karkala and Mudabidri are well known places of Jain worship and Vaishnava rituals. Exquisite Vijayanagar temples built in Chalukya – Malabar region combinational style are seen in Bhatkal, Kumta, Shirali etc. The warm beaches of Karnataka are mostly unspoiled.

Jamboti, 20 km south-west of Belgaum, has popular evergreen hilltop forests.

Karnataka is blessed with over 300 km of pristine coastal stretch. Netrani Island of Uttara Kannada is known for coral reefs. St. Mary's Island, a few kilometres from Udupi has basalt rock formations. Sunny beaches at places like Malpe, Murdeshwar, Maravanthe,
Gokarna, Kumta have spectacular mountains to the east. Agumbe, Kodachadri hills, Kemmangundi, are just a few of many hill stations that straddle the coast providing tourists sun and greenery. Unlike many crowded hill stations in South India, the hill stations of Karnataka are still mostly undiscovered and pristine.

 Gokarna: The Coastal town of Gokarna is a pilgrimage centre as well as a centre of Sanskrit learning, 56 km from Karwar. It has the Mahabaleswar Temple with the 'Atmalinga' dedicated to Shiva. There is an enormous chariot, which is taken out in a procession on Shiva's birthday in February. The Tambraparni Teertha here is considered sacred to perform obsequies of the dead. There is a beach called Om Beach.
 Udupi: One of the holy place and it is 58 km from Mangalore. The Krishna temple here is founded by Acharya Madhwa during the 14th century. He founded eight mathas to conduct the services of Lord Krishna in turns. Paryaya festival is held once in two years in January. The place has Kadiyali Durga temple, Ambalapadi Shakti temple, Raghavendra Matha and the Venkataraman swamy temple. Malpe is the port near here. It has a beach and the Vadabhandeshwara temple of Balarama.
 Thantrady : One of the holy place and it is 22 km from Udupi. The brammasthana temple here founded by sri Ramanna bairy. It was an astabanda bramha. The main archaka of this temple is Nagaraj bairy.

 Karkala: 50 km from Mangalore and 20 km from North of Moodabidire, is Karkala, an important centre of Jainism. There are several temples and a 17 metres high statue of Bahubali (Gomateshwara), situated on a small hill. The statue is a naked figure reached by a flight of rock-cut steps. Some of the temples are Chaturmukha Basti (1587), Neminatha Basti, Ananthapadmanabha Temple (1567) dedicated to Vishnu, and Venkataramana temple (Padutirupathi).
 Venur: Situated 50 km NE of Mangalore, has eight Bastis and ruins of a Mahadeva temple. The largest of them is the 17C Kalli Basti, dedicated to Shantinatha. There is a Gommateshwara Monolith, 11metres high dating back to 1604 in Venur.
 Malpe Beach: Situated 66 km north of Mangalore, near Manipal. It has a tourist beach. The uninhibited St. Mary's Island, accessible by boat, has a beach and an impressive geological formation of basalt rock pillars into the sea.
 Dharmastala: Situated 75 km from Mangalore, Dharmastala is an attractive site surrounded by forested hills, rice fields and by the river Netravati on all sides. The Manjunatha temple here is a pilgrim centre. A Monolithic statue of Bahubali 14metres high was erected here in 1973. Visitors are provided with free boarding and lodging by the temple authorities. There is a small museum, Manjusha Museum located opposite to the temple. There are two temple chariots covered in wooden figures and all types of religious objects including carved and painted panels, bronze sculptures and bells.
 Kollur, 147 km from Mangalore: The temple of goddess Mookambika is located here on top of Kodachadri hill, at the foot of the Western Ghats. The goddess takes the form of a 'Jyotirlinga' incorporating aspects of Shiva and Shakti. It is a pilgrimage centre attracting lot of devotees.
 
 Moodabidre: Situated 35 km from Mangalore, Moodabidire has Jain temples known as Basti's. There are 18 Bastis, the oldest and the largest is the Chandranatha Basti (1429) with its 1000 pillared hall. 'The Jain Matha' near the entrance has an important collection of manuscripts. Other shrines worthy of mention are Shantinatha, Settara, Derama Setti Basti, Guru Basti, Kote and Vikrama Setti Basti.
 Bhatkal: located 135 km from Karwar was the main port of Vijayanagar empire in the 16th century. The ancient town has temples of Vijayanagar style and many Jain monuments. The 17th-century Hindu temple here in Vijayanagar style has animal carvings. 16 km away is the shore temple of Shri Murdeshwar. The temple attracts a lot of devotees and tourists.
 Honnavar: situated 90 km from Karwar, has a Portuguese fort. There is also a fort in Basavaraja Durga Island, amidst the sea which can be reached by a sail upstream on river Sharavathi.
 Ankola: Located 37 km south of Karwar, is a small town with 15th-century ruined walls of King Sarpamalika's fort and the ancient Shri Venketaraman Temple. Near the temple there are two giant wooden chariots carved with scenes from the Ramayana.

 Murdeshwar: The Murdeshwar Temple in Uttara Kannada District of Karnataka now possesses at 249-feet Raja Gopura. The Murdeswar temple complex is renowned for the tallest idol of Lord Shiva in the world, which is 123 feet. The latest addition to the temple, thanks to Mr. RN Shetty an entrepreneur and philanthropist, is the Rajagopuram, which was opened on 12 April 2008. And is it the tallest Hindu Temple Gopuram in the World. If Gopuram can be considered as a unique ornate structure associated with Hindu Temples, then the Gopura of Murdeshwar Temple in Karnataka should be the tallest in the world.

The Rajagopuram of Murdeswar Temple has 21 floors, including the ground floor. The base measures 105 feet in length and 51 feet breadth. The gopura also possess a lift and visitors can go to the top and have an aerial view of the Arabian Sea and the statue of Lord Shiva. Another highlight is the life-size statues of two elephants at the base of the gopura.

World's tallest Siva idol: The highlights of Murdeshwar lie beyond its beach and rural flair. On a little green hill, a 37 m (or 123 feet) Lord Shiva idol sits enthroned, surrounded by smaller statues illustrating moments of the Hindu mythology

Beaches
Karwar has a number of beaches like Blue Lagoon Beach, Ladies Beach around it and Rabindranath Tagore described his experiences at Karwar beach in his poetry. Om beach, Murdeshwar are other beaches of Uttara Kannada Dist. The Nethrani Island near Murdeshwar. Basavaraja Durga near Honavar is an island fort raised by the Keladi Rulers during 16th and 17th centuries. It is surrounded by a strong fortification raised by gigantic laterite blocks and the hill has a flat top. Devagad and Kurmagad are two islands near Karwar.
{Nirvana beach} at Kagal village of Kumta is a 5 km long beach in one stretch with white sand and transparent water in the month of December till March. The entire beach coastline is covered by Casuarina and coconut trees, unparallel to any beach of India, and has the big potential to develop beach tourism like the Baga-Calangute-Candolim beach of Goa. Government of Karnataka and tourism department has failed in tapping this potential, whereas Goa has left Karnataka much behind in beach tourism. There is an urgent need to do something in this direction to allow beach tourism on the same model of Goa in the months of September to may.

Planetarium

 Jawahar Lal Nehru Planetarium: Situated near Cubbon park, Bangalore. It organizes the shows in English and Kannada. Moreover, it has science center for educational activities.
 Swami Vivekananda Planetarium: Situated at Pilikula in Mangalore, it is the 1st 3D Planetarium in India.

South Karnataka

South Karnataka is a unique combination of spectacular vesara style Hoysala architecture, colossal Jain monuments, colonial buildings and palaces of the Kingdom of Mysore, impregnable fort at Chitradurga and densely forested wildlife sanctuaries that offer some of the best eco-tourism available in the country. Belur, Halebidu in Hassan District, Somnathpura in Mysore District, Belavadi, Kalasa and Amrithapura in Chikmagalur District, Balligavi in Shimoga District offer some of the best of Hoysala architecture dating from the 11th to 13th centuries, while Shravanabelagola in Hassan district and Kambadahalli in Mandya District have well known 10th-century Jain monuments. Scenic forests and the high density of wild animals of this region are a popular attraction for those interested in the wilder side of life. Bandipur National Park, Nagarahole, Biligirirangan Hills, Bhadra Wildlife Sanctuary and Bannerghatta national parks are a few popular places for jungle safaris.

The river Kaveri flows east from Kodagu District and along its way one finds important tourist destinations like Shivanasamudra and nearby Sivasamudram Falls,

Srirangapattana and Melkote etc. Mysuru, the cultural capital of the state is home to palaces, colonial buildings and cultural activities including Carnatic music, theatre. Bengaluru the capital is a cosmopolitan city with parks, pubs, restaurants, shopping and fast-paced technology-rich lifestyle.

 Bengaluru: the capital of Karnataka has many tourist attractions.

 
 Mandya: is a city, Sugar factories contribute majorly to the economy of the city. The Mandir of Shri Shirdi Sai Baba popular amongst local Sai Devotees as Mandyada Shri Shiradi Sai Baba Mandir is situated at B.Gowdagere, Gejjalagere village amidsts picturesque natural surrounding in Mandya District of Karnataka. The Mandir is situated at a distance of about 9.3 kilometers from Maddur town and about 12 kilometers from Mandya Town on Bangalore-Mysore State Highway. All the buses playing on Bangalore-Mysore route stops at B.Gowdagere Sai Baba Mandir Entrance situated on the highway. The temple is situated at a distance of just 1 kilometre from the main road. The Mandir is lovingly addressed by everyone as "Namma Tatathana Mane" (Our Grand Father's Home). 
 Belur: Home to the Hoysala temple complex. The Chennakeshava temple here was completed in 1116 by Hoysala Vishnuvardhana. The image is 3.7 m tall and the temple standing on a platform has exquisite plastic art work on its outer walls and bracket figures of dancing girls in various poses in perfect proportion. There are shrines of Kappe Chenniga Andal, Saumya Nayaki etc. The temple here is a classic example of Hoysala art, and Belur was one of the Hoysala Capitals.

 Halebidu: It is 27 km from Hassan, was capital of Hoysala and it was formerly called as Dwarasamudra. It has one of the finest Hoysala temples said to have been started by Ketamalla, a commander of Vishnuvardhana in 1121. The twin Shiva Temples, Hoysaleswara Temple and Kedareshwara Temple with a common platform and two garbhagrihas, one houses for Vishnuvardhana Hoysaleshwara Linga and the other for Shanthaleshwara Linga. In front of Hoysaleshwara is the Nandimantapa and behind that is shrine of Surya with a two-meter-tall image. Outer walls have rows of intricate figures narrating episodes from epics like Ramyana, Mahabartha, and Bhagavata. There are also three Jain basadis equally rich in architecture. The temples are proposed to be listed under UNESCO World Heritage Sites.
 Arasikere: It is 41 km from Hassan and 176 km from Bangalore. It has coconut gardens. There is a Kattameshwara temple here which is also called Chandramoulishwara and referred to as Kalmeshwara in the records. It is a fine Hoysala monument with a rare polygonal frontal Mantapa with special design. There is a fine Haluvokkalu Temple and also a Sahasrakuta Jinalaya. Malekal Tirupathi near Arasikere has a venkataramana temple visited by many devotees.
 Aralaguppe: There is a Kalleshwara temple in the Ganga-Nalamba style of the 9th century. Its ceiling has a dancing Shiva sculpture with musical accompanists and eight Dikpalas surrounding him with all their paraphernalia. There is a Chennakeshava temple of the Hoysala style. An image of Vishnu lies in the garbhagriha. There are four Ganga temples.
 Madhugiri: It is 43 km from Tumkur and has a large hill fort. The ancient name of the place is Maddagiri. It has the temples of Venkataramana and Malleshwara built by Vijayanagara feudatories. There is also a Mallinatha basadi. The fort has gateways called Antaralada Bagilu, Diddibagilu, Mysore Gate etc. 19 km from here is another hill fort called Midigeshi.
 Madikeri or Mercara: Known as Scotland of India, Mercara known for its climate. It has many places of attraction such as Tala Cauvery, Nagarahole National Park, Abbe Water Falls, St. Mark's Church, Bagamandala, Cauvery Nisargadhama, Belegiri Hills, Thadiyanda Murali Kund, Igguthappa Temple, Irupu Falls And Coffee & Tea Estates.

 Srirangapattana: It is 14 km from Mysore & it is an island in between two branches of the Cauvery. It was also the capital of the Mysore rulers. There is a Ranganath temple here. The fort here was built in 1454. The Mysore rules made it their capital in 1610 in the days of Raja Wodeyar, who took it from the Vijayanagara Governor. The Ranganatha temple is called Adi Ranga. Ganjam has Dariya Daulat palace of Tipu and Gumbaz, the mausoleum of Haider and Tipu. Both are impressive structures of Indo-Saracenic style. The palace has paintings, fine woodwork and it houses a museum.
 Melukote: It is a religious centre which attracts lakhs of people during its annual feast Vairamudi. The temple was reconstructed in the Hoysala style by Visnuvardhana with the guidance of Ramanujacharya, a Visistadvaitist, in the 11th century. There are Cheluvanarayanaswamy temple, Kalyani, Hill shrine of Lord Narasimha, Thottilamadu, Dhanuskoti, Academy of Sanskrit Research and many more to visit. The nearest tourist places are Thondanur, Srirangapatna, Karigatta, Nagamangala etc.,
 Mahadeshwara Betta: It is 220 km from Bangalore and 142 km from Mysore. It is very close to eastern Ghats. It is said that a saint called Mahadeshwara, who could ride a tiger, lived and had his gadduge here during the 14th and 15th centuries. The hill is full of thick forests and thousands of pilgrims visit the place.
 Talakadu: A Holy place on the banks of the Cauvery. It is full of sands, carried by the wind from the dried bed of the river. It was the second capital of the Gangas. They built the Pataleshwara and the Maruleshwara templeshere. Hoysala Vishnuvardhana built Kirti Narayana temple.

 Bhadravathi: It is an industrial town in Shimoga district 256 km away from Bangalore, which was earlier known as "Benkipura". There is a 13th-century Lakshminarayan Temple in Hoysala style. An iron and steel works, a cement factory and a paper factory are located on the banks of Bhadra river.
 Ikkeri: It was a capital town of the Keladi Nayakas from 1512, and a place is 2 km from Sagara City. The Aghoreshwara temple is a 16th-century monument of great attraction. There is also a Paravathi temple nearby. Keladi is another place nearby, the original capital. It has the Rameshwara and Veerabhadra temples. There is also a museum.
 Sravanabelgola: It has a statue of Lord Bahubali. The place is an important Jain pilgrimage center and has a long history. The 17 meter high statue of Bahubali is said to be the tallest monolithic structure in the world. It overlooks the small town of Shravanbelgola from the top of the rocky hill known as Indragiri. One can reach this hill after ascending 614 rock-cut steps.
 Somnathpura: It is the home to one of the best examples of Hoysala temple architecture, the Kesava Temple.

 Jog Falls: the highest waterfalls in India, is located about 30 km from Sagara City, Karnataka. The Sharavati river drops 253 metres in 4 separate falls known as Rani-the Rocket and Raja-the Roarer. The highest is the Raja with the fall of 253 metres and a pool below 40metres deep. The best time to visit is Late November to early January. The 50 km long Hirebhasgar Reservoir and the Linganamkki dam regulates the flow of the Sharavati river to generate the hydro electricity.
 Mekedatu: It is a picnic spot by the river Cauvery. It tumbles down through a deep ravine, on top of which is a chasm around 5 meters wide. Mekedatu is on Kanakapura Road.
 Hesaraghatta: Hesaraghatta has an artificial lake, a dairy and a horticulture farm. Boating and windsurfing are the other attractions. Also here is the Nrityagrama where young dancers are trained in all disciplines of traditional dance.
 Shivagange: A hill with four faces, rising to a height of 4599 ft looks like a Nandi from the East, Ganesh from the West, A Linga from the South and Cobra with it hood spread from the North side. It is accessible by road.
 Shivanasamudram: The waterfalls, the Ganganchukki and the Bharachukki, cascade down 90 meters. These falls are the source of Asia's first Hydro Electric Power Station called "Shimsa". The falls are in full splendour during July–August. The falls are 122 km from Bangalore.
 Hogenakkal Falls: These are also known as the 'smoking rocks' because of the mist. At the bottom of the 90 ft water falls, one can ride in a coracle.
 Devarayanadurga: This is a hill station of Tumkur road perched at a height of 3940 feet. A few kilometres from foot of the hills is a natural spring called Namada Chilume.

Palaces

 Bangalore Palace
 Mysore Palace,Also known as Ambavilas Palace
 Nalknad Palace
 Rajendra Vilas
 Jaganmohan Palace
 Jayalakshmi Vilas Mansion
 Lalitha Mahal
 Cheluvamba Mansion, Mysore
 Shivappa Nayaka Palace
 Daria Daulat Bagh

Forts
In Karnataka there are thousands of Forts, in Kannada called as Kote or Gad or Durga.

The Forts in Karnataka are belongs to various dynasties, some of them are more than thousand years old.

 Malliabad Fort
 Jaladurga
  Bahaddur Bandi Fort
 Kyadigera Fort
 Bidar Fort
 Basavakalyana Fort
  Bhalki Fort
 Manyakheta Fort
 Kittur Fort
 Parasgad Fort
 Belgaum Fort
 Saundatti Fort
 Ramdurg Fort
 Bailhongal Fort
 Hooli Fort
 Gokak Fort
 Shirasangi Fort
 Bijapur Fort
 Gajendrgad Fort
 Korlahalli Fort
 Hammigi Fort
 Hemagudda Fort
 Mundargi Fort
 Singatalur Fort
 Tippapura Fort
 Nargund Fort
 Magadi Fort
 Jamalabad Fort
  Barkur Fort
 Daria-Bahadurgad Fort
 Kapu Fort
 Havanur Fort
 Mirjan Fort
 Sadashivgad Fort
 Asnoti
 Sanduru Fort
 Bellary Fort
 Adoni Fort
 Koppal Fort
 Anegundi Fort
 Kampli Fort
 Irakalgada
 Gulbarga Fort
 Sedam Fort
 Shahpur Fort
 Madhugiri
 Aihole Fort
 Badami Fort
 Bankapura Fort
 Savanur Fort
 Chitradurga Fort
 Devanahalli Fort
 Vanadurga Fort
 Channagiri Fort
 Kavaledurga Fort
 Basavaraj durga fort
  Uchangidurga Fort
 Budikote|
 Fort Anjediva
 Gudibanda
 Wagingera Fort
 Bangalore Fort
 Bhimgad Fort
 Kammatadurga
 Pavagada
 Madikeri Fort
 Savandurga
 Makalidurga|
 Vanadurga
 Sanmudageri
 Vishalgad
 Nagara Fort
 Basavaraja Fort
 Rayadurg
 Huthridurga
 Ambajidurga|
 Manjarabad Fort
 Skandagiri
 Hosadurga
 Nagara Fort
  Sathyamangalam Fort
  Tekkalakote Fort
  Thirthahalli Fort
 Raichur Fort

Botanical and Rock gardens
 Lalbagh
 Brindavan Gardens
 Cubbon Park
 The Botanical Garden, University of Agricultural Sciences
 Karnataka University Botany Garden, Karnataka University
 Pampavana Garden, Munirabad
 University of Mysore Botanic Garden, University of Mysore
 Curzon Park, Mysore
 Nishat Baugh, Mysore
 Forest Research Centre Botanic Garden
Utsav Rock Garden, Shiggaon: Sculptural Garden located near NH-4 Pune-Bangalore road, Gotagodi Village, Shiggaon Taluk, Haveri District, Karnataka. Utsav Rock Garden is a sculptural garden representing contemporary art and rural culture. A typical village is created where men and women are involved in their daily household activities.A unique picnic spot which delights common people, educated and intellectuals. There are more than 1000 sculptures in the garden of different sizes. It is an anthropological museum. It represents traditional farming, crafts, folklore, cattle herding and sheep rearing.

Hill stations

The Hill stations in Karnataka are generally unexplored and more pristine than better known ones in South India.

 Agumbe, Shimoga District
 Kodachadri, Shimoga District
 Biligiriranga Hills, Chamarajanagar District
 Baba Budangiri, Chikkamagaluru District
 Kemmangundi, Chikkamagaluru District
 Kudremukh, Chikkamagaluru District
 Mullayanagiri
 Pushpagiri(or Kumara Parvatha)
 Nandi Hills, Chikkaballapur district
 Kundadri
 Tadiandamol
 Talakaveri
 Male Mahadeshwara Hills
 Himavad Gopalaswamy Betta
 Ambaragudda
 Antara Gange
 Savandurga
 Kurinja
 Yedakumeri
 Siddara Betta
 Bananthimari Betta
 Skandagiri
 Devarayanadurga
 Madhugiri hill station
Mullaiyanagiri highest peak

National parks and wildlife

Karnataka in all has 21 wildlife sanctuaries and 5 National parks. Well known among them are Bandipur National Park in chamarajanagara District, Bannerghatta National Park in Bangalore district, Nagarhole National Park in Mysore District and Kodagu district, Kudremukh National Park in Dakshina Kannada and Chickmagalur district, Dandeli & Anshi National Park in Uttara Kannada district, Gudavi and Mandegadde bird sanctuaries and Sharavati WLS in Sagara Taluk, Shimoga District, Biligirirangan Hills WLS in Chamarajanagar district, Ranganathittu Bird Sanctuary in Mandya district, Brahmagiri wildlife sanctuary and Pushpagiri Wildlife Sanctuary in Kodagu district. Interior dry areas have their own unique wildlife.

There are twenty-one wildlife sanctuaries and five national parks in all.

Recently, the government of India has proposed to the UNESCO to include important ecosystems in the Western Ghats as a World Heritage Site. Two subclusters of natural areas occurring in the list are entirely in the Karnataka region covering several wildlife sanctuaries and some reserve forests. Fragile and exotic ecosystems like Kudremukh NP, Brahmagiri WLS, Pushpagiri WLS, Agumbe, Talakaveri WLS, Someshvara WLS figure in this list. As such, the Western Ghats that run south–north through the Karnataka is considered as one among the twenty-five bio-diversity hotspots of the world.

The Niligiri Biosphere Reserve (also a designated UNESCO Biosphere reserve) is located at the junction of Karnataka, Tamil Nadu and Kerela. Nagarahole National Park WLS and Bandipur National Park and Nugu WLS in Karnataka are included in this biosphere reserve.

The state is home to the largest concentration of Asian Elephants along Kabini River in Nagarahole and Bandipur parks. These two parks also hold among the most viable population of the highly endangered Indian Tiger. Ranebennur Blackbuck sanctuary in Haveri district is home to one of the largest populations of blackbuck anywhere in India. The Doraji wildlife sanctuary and areas in Karnataka like Bellary district, Chitradurga are strongholds of the sloth bear.

Karnataka is home to more than 500 species of birds.

Wildlife sanctuaries

 Dandeli Wildlife Sanctuary, near to Hubli-Dharwad (70 km), Uttara Kannada: spread over 834.16 km2, it is the second largest wildlife sanctuary in Karnataka and is contiguous with the Mahaveer sanctuary in Goa.
 Ghataprabha Bird Sanctuary: small bird sanctuary incorporating the wetland along the river. It was established in 1974 and encompasses an area of 29 km2.
 Daroji Bear Sanctuary, 15 kilometers from Hampi.
 Peacock sanctuary in Bankapura, Shiggon taluk: Bankpur Fort is the second sanctuary in India exclusively engaged in the conservation and breeding of peacocks. It is also home to a variety of other birds.
 Ranebennur blackbuck sanctuary, Haveri district: declared a wildlife sanctuary on 17 June 1974, with a core area of 14.87 km and a buffer zone of 104.13 km for tourists. It is divided into three blocks namely Hulathi, Hunasikatti and Alageri for administrative purposes. The vegetation comprises mainly scrub forests and eucalyptus plantations. Other resident fauna include wild pigs, foxes, jackals and wolves.
 Deva Raya Wildlife Sanctuary, near Hampi, Bellary District: A privately owned sanctuary, named after kings of the Vijayanagar Empire.
 Attiveri Bird Sanctuary, near to Hubli-Dharwad, Uttara Kannada district: spread over an area of about 2.23 km2, the sanctuary is located in and around the Attiveri reservoir.
 Anshi National Park, Uttara Kannada: A habitat for tigers, leopards and elephants, about 340 square kilometres in size. Adjoins the Dandeli wildlife sanctuary.
 Magadi Bird Sanctuary, Shirahatti Taluk, Gadag District
 Bhimagada Sanctuary, Belgaum District
 Adichunchanagiri Wildlife Sanctuary:
 Arabithittu Wildlife Sanctuary:
 Biligiriranga Swamy Temple Wildlife Sanctuary:
 Bhadra Wildlife Sanctuary:
 Brahmagiri Wildlife Sanctuary:
 Cauvery Wildlife Sanctuary:
 Melukote Temple Wildlife Sanctuary: This is located in Mandya district
 Mookambika Wildlife Sanctuary
 Nugu Wildlife Sanctuary
 Pushpagiri Wildlife Sanctuary
 Sharavathi Valley Wildlife Sanctuary in Sagara Taluk
 Shettihalli Wildlife Sanctuary:
 Someshwara Wildlife Sanctuary: This is located in Udupi district
 Talakaveri Wildlife Sanctuary: This is located in Kodagu district
 Gudavi Bird Sanctuary: This is located in Shimoga district and is spread over 0.73 km2. The tree species that dominate this sanctuary are Vitex leucoxylon and Phyllanthus polyphyllus. 191 species of birds are recorded here including white ibis, pheasant-tailed jacana, purple moorhen and little grebe.
 Mandagadde Bird Sanctuary
 Kaggaladu Heronry: This is located in Tumkur district and is one of the largest painted storks sanctuary in South India. Some of the birds that nest here are painted storks, grey herons, pelicans, black stilts and ducks.
 Kokkare Bellur
This sanctuary was created mainly for the conservation of peacocks.
 Bonal Bird Sanctuary : This is located about 10 km from Shorapur city in Yadgir district.

Dams and Resorvoir in Karnataka

 Almatti Dam across Krishna River
 Basava Sagara Dam, Lingsugur
 Bennethora Reservoir, near Harsur, Gulbarga district
 Bhadra Dam across Bhadra River
 Chakra Dam on the Chakra river
 Chikahole Dam, Chamarajnagar
 Daroji Reservoir, near Hospet, Bellary district
 Devarabelekere Reservoir, Davanagere district
 Dhupdal Dam, River Ghataprabha: constructed in 1883 with a nearby inspection bungalow
 Dhup Reservoir across Ghataprabha, Gokak
 Gajanuru Dam across Tunga River
 Gayathri Reservoir
 Garura Dam Krishna River
 Gersoppa dam /Sharawathi tailrace
 Harangi Reservoir Kushalnagar, Kodagu Dist
 Hemavathi Reservoir (Gorur Dam), Hassan Dist
 Hidkal Jalashaya (Dam) across Ghataprabha
 Iglooru Dam across shimsha river, Mandya Dist
 Kabini Reservoir Beechanahalli, H.D Kote, Mysore Dist
 Kadra Dam, Uttara Kannada district
 Kanva Reservoir
 Karanja Reservoir, Halikhed, Bidar District
 Kempu Hole Dam
 Kodasalli Dam
 Krishna Raja Sagara Dam on Kaveri River
 Lakkavali Dam across Bhadra river
 Linganamakki Dam on Sharavathi River in Sagara Taluk
 Manchinabeli Dam
 Mani Reservoir, near Thirthahalli, Shimoga district
 Munirabad, Koppal District
 Marconhalli Dam, Kunigal, Tumkur Dist
 Nagara Reservoir, near Nagara, Shimoga district
 Narayanapur
 Narayanpur Dam downstream of Almatti Dam
 Nugu Dam, Beerwal, H.D.Kote, Mysore Dist
 Naviltheertha Dam across Malaprabha
 Thumbe Dam across Nethravathi river
 Renuka Sagara Reservoir, Saundatti, Belgaum district
 Savehaklu Reservoir, near Thirthahalli, Shimoga district
 Shanti Sagara or Sulekere Reservoir, Chinnagiri, Davanagere district
 Shirur Dam, near Ankalgi, Belgaum district
 Supa Dam across Kali River, Ganeshgudi near Dandeli and Joida
 Suvarnawathi Dam, Chamarajnagar
 Talakalale Balancing Reservoir, near Sagara, Shimoga district
 Taraka Reservoir, H.D.Kote, Mysore Dist
 Tungabhadra Dam
 Thippagondanahalli Reservoir
 Vani Vilasa Sagara, (Marikanive), Hiriyur, Chitradurga Dist
 Watehole Dam, near Arehalli, Hassan Dist
 Yagachi Dam on the Yagachi River, Belur Taluka, Hassan District
 Gayathri reservoir, Hiriyur taluk, Chitradurga Dist

Caves
Some well known caves in Karnataka are Yana caves and Kavala caves and Syntheri rocks in Uttara Kannada district, Sugriva's cave in Hampi holds similarity to the descriptions of 'Kishkinda' in the epic Ramayana, hundreds of caves in Basava Kalyana in Bidar District.

 Aihole
 Badami cave temples
 Gavi Gangadhareshwara Temple
 Nellitheertha Cave Temple
 Hulimavu Shiva cave temple
 Pandava caves Mangalore
 Savandurga
 Kavala Caves
 Anthargange

Waterfalls

Karnataka has a number of waterfalls. Jog Falls of Sagara Taluk is one of the highest waterfalls in Asia. Some well known waterfalls are Varapoha Falls, Magod Falls, Lalgulli Falls, Sathodi Falls, Unchalli Falls, Lushington Falls, Shivaganga Falls, Ulavi Falls, Irupu Falls, Sivasamudram Falls near Shivanasamudra, Balmuri Falls, Gokak Falls, Abbe Falls, Achakanya Falls, Chunchanakatte Falls, Hebbe Falls, Kallathigiri Falls, Sogal Falls, Godachinamalki Falls etc.

 Gokak Falls, Ghataprabha River, near Gokak, Belgaum district: It drops from 52 metres over a sandstone cliff in a gorge. It is known locally as "mini Niagara" Hydro Electric Power has been harnessed at the falls since 1887 to run a cotton mill. Temples near the falls date from Badami Chalukyas to later Chalukya times and Vijayanagara periods. A suspension bridge crosses the river
 Godachinamalki Falls, Markhandeya River, near Godachinamalki, Belgaum district.
 Lushington Falls, Aghanashini River, Siddhapur Taluk: 116 meters in height and named after a district collector who discovered them in 1845
 Magod Falls, Gangavathi River, 125 km from Karwar: 183 metres (600 feet) in height, consists of a series of cascades over cliffs
 Varapoha Falls, Mahadayi River, in the Jamboti forest

Eco-tourism

The districts of the Western Ghats and the southern districts have popular eco tourism locations. Some of the popular locations include Kudremukh, Madikeri and Agumbe. Karnataka boasts of the highest elephant Gaur bison and tiger population (greater than 6000, 8000 and 400 respectively) in India. Its forests hold some of the largest remaining populations of the endangered tiger and leopard.
Eco-tourism is a very popular activity in the state. Karnataka leads other states in eco-tourism. Jungle Lodges & Resorts, a state-run organisation has camping and safari facilities in several wildlife sanctuaries. Private safari providers have sprung up in several places along the western ghats.

Nirvana beach is one of the finest beaches near Kumta and has a 5 km coastline with white sand and palm trees covering the entire coast, could be developed for eco beach tourism on the adjoining land falling in CRZ II category falling within 200 meters from HTL. Farmers and fishermen were allowed to run beach cottages and beach shacks by government of Goa, tourism department to attract tourists from around the world as well as domestic tourists, in the months of September till may every season.

Several NGO's (youth groups) are actively involved in birding and other conservation activities.

Adventure and outdoor activities
Adventure tourism has been growing at a pace of around 24% in Karnataka. The presence of Nilgiris, Western Ghats, rocky regions, waterfalls and lots of lakes and rivers make it an attractive destination. Certain activities at some regions namely Rock climbing at Hampi and Ramnagaram; Mountain biking at Nilgiris; Rafting at Honnemaradu in Sagara, Bheemeshwari, Dandeli and Coorg are famous.
 
Besides this Sawandurga, Manchinbele (Feverpitch basecamp), Bheemeshwari Antharagange are also famous for rappelling, river crossing, caving and kayaking. There have been more than 100 places for trekking in Karnataka and many of them are organised by Government of Karnataka or government approved local vendors. Seasonal surfing is available in Gokarna and Kaup. Fever pitch base camp has been developed by tourism industry professionals which is located 40 km from Bangalore near Magadi.

Bisle Ghat which is stretch of Western ghats from Kerala to Gujarat is also famous for trekking and adventurous activities. Farmers son Paintball arena and other ATV & Dirtbike sports are some of the things to do at Hassan.

Karnataka tourism started promoting Motorcycle tourism and tied up with Wicked Ride a Bengaluru-based motorcycle rental company to promote adventure and motorcycle tourism as a policy, they are working to set up camping sites across the state to provide safe and clean camping sites for backpackers and motorcyclists to explore the state.

Rock climbers visit several areas in Karnataka:
 Yana, Uttara Kannada
 Ramanagara, 50 km from Bangalore.
 Shivagange, Bangalore district
 Tekal, Kolar district
 Turahalli Forest
 Hampi
 Kunti Betta
 Anthargange, Kolar
 Skandagiri, Bangalore
 Devarayandurga, Tumkur
 Karadigudda, Magadi

Trekking in Karnataka. Some of the most popular treks are:
 Dandeli
 Tadiyandamol Trek (Coorg)
 Kodachadri Trek
 Bheemeshwari Trek
 Kudremukh Trek
 Shakaleshpur Trek
 Dabbe falls (Sagara)
 Karwar Beach trek
 Madhugiri Fort Trek
 Sawandurga Trek
 Agumbe Rain Forest trek
 Makalidurga Trek
Kumara Parvatha Trek(Pushpagiri)
 Green Route

Healthcare tourism
In the last couple of years Karnataka has emerged as a hot spot for health care tourism in India attracting health tourists from all over the world. Karnataka has highest number of approved health systems and alternative therapies. Along with some ISO certified government owned hospitals, private institutions which provide international quality services have caused health care industry to grow up to 30% during 2004–05. Hospitals in Karnataka treat around 8,000 and more health tourists every year.

The Golden Chariot
The Golden Chariot is a luxury tourist train of Karnataka operated by Indian Railways
and KSTDC (Karnataka State Tourism Development Corporation). Initially train was introduced exclusively for Karnataka, but recently it is expanded to whole south India. The train travels to the Karnataka's tourist destinations like Bangalore, Kabini, Mysore, Beluru, Halebidu, Shravanabelagola, Hampi, Badami, Pattadakal, Aihole and Goa.

Train coaches are named after the Karnataka dynasties like Kadamba, Hoysala, Rashtrakuta, Ganga,
Chalukya, Bahamani, Adil Shahi, Sangama, Satavahana, Yadukula and Vijayanagar.

Administration 
Karnataka Tourism is the popular name of the Department of Tourism, Government of Karnataka (website: karnatakatourism.org).

Karnataka Tourism is responsible for the sustainable development of tourism in Karnataka along with marketing of the destination worldwide. Karnataka's destination branding and marketing is done by India's leading tourism marketing organisation, Stark Communications. Stark is part of The Stark Group under whose umbrella are companies such as Stark Communications, Stark Expo, Starkworld Publishing, Stark Expo, starkwebworks, Stark Tourism Forum.

Karnataka Tourism develops hospitality infrastructure through two government-owned companies, Jungle Lodges & Resorts and Karnataka State Tourism Development Corporation.

See also
 Tourism in India

References

External links

 Official website of Karnataka Tourism (Department of Tourism, Government of Karnataka)

Tourism in Karnataka